Platyptilia suigensis is a moth of the family Pterophoridae. It is found in Japan and Korea.

References

Moths described in 1931
suigensis
Taxa named by Shōnen Matsumura